The First Dunstan Ministry was the 49th ministry of the Government of Victoria. It was led by the Premier of Victoria, Albert Dunstan. The ministry was sworn in on 2 April 1935, and was the first Country Party ministry in the history of Victoria.

Portfolios

References

Victoria (Australia) ministries
Ministries of George V